Podlashuks (Podlachian: Пудляшуки,   Podlašuki; ;) are an East Slavic ethnic group from Podlachia, a historical region in northeastern Poland which includes the Podlaskie and Lublin Voivodeships. Some Podlashuks identify as Belarusian, Ukrainian, or Polish, while others identify as a distinct ethnic group.

Language 

Religion 
Podlashuks in northern Podlachia, located within Podlaskie Voivodeship, are mostly Eastern Orthodox, while those in southern Podlachia, in Lublin Voivodeship, are mostly Roman Catholic.

Citations

References 

Ukrainian diaspora in Poland
Belarusians in Poland
East Slavs
Ethnic groups in Poland
Slavic ethnic groups